Kauda Bole Alice is a 2000 Sri Lankan Sinhala comedy action film directed by Sunil Soma Peiris and produced by SY Films and Sunil T. Fernando for Sunil T. Films. It stars Bandu Samarasinghe and Dilhani Ekanayake in lead roles along with Ravindra Yasas, and Rex Kodippili. Music composed by Somapala Rathnayake. It is the 933rd Sri Lankan film in the Sinhala cinema. It is a remake of Hollywood film Mrs. Doubtfire.

Plot
Janaka and Nirmala are parents of three children. The couple gets a divorce due to differences between them specially because of Janaka's indifference towards his family. Although the couple is separated Janaka leaves home with regrets about his children.

Meanwhile Nirmala finds employment and looks out for a servant to look after her children in her absence. On seeing an advertisement for a servant Janaka came to the house in the guise of a woman named Alice, who cannot cook. However she wins the hearts of the family members. One day the two elder children identify Alice as their father but keeps it as a secret.

On an invitation from the head of Nirmala's work place the family members go for a dinner at a hotel. In the hotel Nirmala and others identify Janaka. Once again Janaka is forced to leave his children. But circumstances compel Janaka to return but not as Janaka but as Alice forever.

Cast
 Bandu Samarasinghe as Janaka/ Alice
 Dilhani Ekanayake as Nirmala
 Ravindra Yasas as Siri Ayya
 Rex Kodippili as Nelson Fernando
 Suresh Gamage as Vickrama
 Sonia Disa as Hilda Nona
 Saman Hemaratne as Siri's friend
 Janesh Silva as Barber
 Arjuna Kamalanath as Vickrama's friend, cameo appearance
 Chathura Perera as Waiter, cameo appearance

Soundtrack

References

2000 films
2000s Sinhala-language films
Films set in Sri Lanka (1948–present)
Remakes of Sri Lankan films
2000 action comedy films
Sri Lankan comedy films
2000 comedy films